Peja (Indefinite Albanian form: Pejë ) or Peć is the fourth largest city of Kosovo and seat of Peja Municipality and Peja District. It is situated in the region of Rugova on the eastern section of the Accursed Mountains along Peja's Lumbardh in the western part of Kosovo.

In medieval times the city, then commonly known under its Serbian name, was the seat of the Serbian Orthodox Church in 1346. The Patriarchal monastery of Peć is a UNESCO World Heritage Site as part of the Medieval Monuments in Kosovo. Under Ottoman rule the city, then commonly known under the Turkish name İpek, became a district capital with mosques and civil architecture. From the end of the nineteenth century until today, the city has been the site of nationalist aspirations and claims for both ethnic Albanians and Serbs, often resulting in tense inter-ethnic relations and conflict.

According to the 2011 census, the city of Peja has 48,962 inhabitants, while the municipality has 96,450 inhabitants.

Etymology 

In Serbian, peć means "furnace" or "cave", and its name is probably connected with nearby caves in the Rugova Canyon that served as hermit cells for Serbian Orthodox monks. In medieval Ragusan documents, the Serbian name of the city (Peć, lit. "furnace") is sometimes translated as Forno, meaning "furnace" in Italian. During Ottoman rule, it was known as Ottoman Turkish İpek (ايپك). The Albanian name's definite form is Peja and the indefinite Pejë, which descents from the name Siparantum. Other names of the city include Latin Pescium and Greek Episkion (Επισκιον). The city was first mentioned as Siparantum, by Ptolemy in his work Gheographia.

History

Early development 

The city is located in a strategic position on Peja's Lumbardh, a tributary of the White Drin to the east of the Accursed Mountains. The medieval city was possibly built on the ruins of Siparant(um), a Roman municipium (town or city). The area has the most unearthed stelae in all of Kosovo.

Slavs (Sclaveni and Antes) settled the Balkans, heavily depopulated by "Barbarians", in the 6th century. The Byzantine Empire and the First Bulgarian Empire fought for control of the area until it finally fell under full Serbian control. Between 1180 and 1190, Serbian Grand Prince Stefan Nemanja annexed Peja with its surrounding župa (district) of Hvosno from the Byzantine Empire, thus establishing Serbian rule over the city of Peja for next 300 years. In 1220, Serbian King Stefan Nemanjić donated Peja and several surrounding villages to his newly founded monastery of Žiča. As Žiča was the seat of a Serbian archbishop, Peja came under direct rule of Serbian archbishops and later patriarchs who built their residences and numerous churches in the city starting with the church of Holy Apostles built by archbishop Saint Arsenije I Sremac. After the Žiča monastery was burned by the Cumans in the 1290s, the seat of Serbian archbishop was transferred to a more secure location, the Patriarchal Monastery of Peć. The city became a major religious center of medieval Serbia under the Serbian Emperor Stefan Dušan, who made it the seat of the Serbian Orthodox Church in 1346. It remained the seat of the Serbian Orthodox Church until the abolition of the Serbian Patriarchate of Peć in 1766.

Ottoman Empire 

Peja came under Ottoman rule after its capture in 1455. In Turkish, the town was known as İpek. The town became the center of the Sanjak of İpek (or Dukagjin), governed by Mahmut Pasha Dukagjini as its first sanjakbey (lord). The Sanjak of Dukagjin had four kazas: Peja, Gjakova, Gusinje and Berane.

During the 15th and 16th centuries, Orthodox Albanians formed the majority of the region's population whereas Slavs formed a minority. The Slavs had arrived during the period of Serbian rule in Kosovo through the Middle Ages as colonists from Slavic regions north of Kosovo or as a stratum of the ruling class. In the Ottoman defters of the time, there existed a designation for new arrivals to the region; in the region of Peja and Suhogërla, new arrivals existed within about a third of the villages, with their anthroponomy indicating that only 4 of these new 180 arrivals had Albanian names, whereas the rest had characteristically Slavic names. This suggests that an arrival of a Slavic element to the northeast of the Sanjak of Shkodra occurred during the 15th-16th centuries, and the absence of this trend in the rest of the Sanjak of Shkodra indicates that these Slav populations hailed from Slavic-inhabited regions outside of Peja itself. In 1582, Ottoman cadastral records indicated that 23 villages in the Nahiya of Peja were inhabited by an Albanian majority due to the dominance of Albanian anthroponomy amongst its inhabitants; 85 villages had mixed Albanian-Slavic anthroponomy, and the rest contained almost exclusively Slavic anthroponomy. The villages with a certain Albanian majority were Osak (Usak), Kramor, Ljepovaç, Trakagjin, Strelec, Romaniça, Sredna Çirna Goi, Nivokas, Temshenica, Trepova pole, Novasel, Dobri Lipari, Boshanica, Brestovac, Baç (Beç), Tokina pole, Novasel (another Novasel), Dujak, Dobroshi i Madh, Vraniq, Mraç or Çirna Potok, Dolina Çirna Goi and Preloniça. The documentation of Albanians in Peja at the end of the 15th centuries - which coincides with the very beginning of Ottoman rule in Kosovo - presupposes that the Albanians of Peja were early inhabitants of the region. By the 1582 Defter, the city of Peja itself had been significantly Islamised - several cases exist where Muslim inhabitants have a blend of Islamic and Albanian anthroponomy (such as the widespread Deda family - Rizvan Deda, Haxhi Deda, Ali Deda...). The Muslim neighbourhoods include Xhamia Sherif, Sinan Vojvoda, Piri bej, Ahmed Bej, Hysein, Hasan Çelebi, Mustafa bej, Mahmud Kadi, Orman, Kapishniça, Mesxhidi Haxhi Mahmud, Bali bej and Çeribash. The Christian neighbourhoods include Gjura Papuxhi, Nikolla (abandoned), Nikolla Vukman (abandoned), Andrija (abandoned) and Olivir. The inhabitants of the two Christian neighbourhoods - Olivir and Gjura Papuxhi - had a blend of characteristically Albanian and Slavic/Orthodox anthroponomy.

In 1835 the Albanian population supported by other Albanian rebels from Shkodra took over the town from the Ottomans.

The Albanian nationalist organization League of Peja established in 1899 was based in the city. The organization, led by Haxhi Zeka, adopted the character of the earlier League of Prizren to defend the rights of Ottoman Albanians and seek autonomous status within the empire. After an armed clash with Ottoman forces in 1900 the organization ended its operations.

Modern period 

Ottoman rule came to an end in the First Balkan War of 1912–13, when Montenegro took control of the city on 28 October 1912. On 8 January 1916, during World War I, Austria-Hungary took the city. Peja was taken by Serbian forces on 17 October 1918. After World War I, the city became part of Yugoslavia (at first officially called the Kingdom of Serbs, Croats and Slovenes). Between 1931 and 1941 the city was part of Zeta Banovina.

During World War II Peja was occupied by the Italian puppet state of Albania. Following Italy's capitulation in the last months of 1943, several hundred Serbs were massacred by Albanian paramilitaries in Peja and its vicinity. After the war, Peja again became part of Yugoslavia as part of the Autonomous Region of Kosovo and Metohija (1945–1963), an autonomous unit within the Socialist Republic of Serbia.

Relations between Serbs and Albanians, who were the majority population, were often tense during the 20th century. They came to a head in the Kosovo War of 1999, during which the city suffered heavy damage and mass killings. The Panda Bar massacre occurred in Peja, and the perpetrators of the massacre remained unknown until the Serbian government admitted that the massacre was a black operation carried out by Serbian intelligence operatives, although news agencies falsely reported that it was done by the KLA. More than 80 percent of the total 5280 houses in the city were heavily damaged (1590) or destroyed (2774). It suffered further damage in violent inter-ethnic unrest in 2004.

Geography 

Peja in Western Kosovo near the Rugova Canyon or Gorge. Rugova is a mountainous region entered through the North-West part of the city of Peja. It is the third region of Accursed Mountains. In 2013 it became a National Park. Rugova is known for its natural environment and access to the mountains. The city is located some 250 kilometres (155 miles) north of Tirana, Albania, 150 kilometres (93 miles) north-west of Skopje, North Macedonia, 85 kilometres (52 miles) west of Pristina, Kosovo and some 280 kilometres (173 miles) east of Podgorica, Montenegro.

Climate 

Politics 

, the whole municipality has a population of approximately 95,723, of which ca. 48,962 live in the city of Peja.

International relations 

Peja is twinned with:

 Afyonkarahisar, Turkey
 Bağcılar, Turkey
 Berane, Montenegro
 Eger
 Fier, Albania
 Gusinje, Montenegro
 Hörby, Sweden
 Johnston, United States
 Nilüfer, Turkey
 Stari Grad (Sarajevo), Bosnia and Herzegovina
 Yalova, Turkey

Economy

Tourism 

Peja is rapidly developing a significant tourist infrastructure. You can find information and maps for the "Trail of Cultural Monuments" at the Tourist Information Office as well as maps and attractions in the Rugova Gorge/Canyon and surrounding mountains. Skiing is available at the Ski Center in Bogë nearby. One of the most exciting new attractions is the Peak of the Balkans trail.  The trail wanders through 3 countries with mountain views and can be supported by local guides and tour companies. Pećka Banja is a township located in the municipality of Istok, Kosovo. To many people it is known with the name Ilixhe. It is a touristic-health center with services in Istok and in the region, highly developed infrastructure and every service needed for healthy living. The cite has seen a bloom of tourism with a new Zip Line, and two Via Ferrata, built between 2013 and 2016. In the city there are a number of tour operators that function, with Balkan Natural Adventure, being the main one with a full palette of services.

Infrastructure

Education 

Education in Peja is a system with no tuition or fees, mandatory for all children between the ages of 6–18. It consists of a nine-year basic comprehensive school (starting at age six and ending at the age of fifteen) secondary general and professional education commonly known as high school and higher education at Haxhi Zeka University of Peja. It also includes non-mandatory daycare programs for babies and toddlers and a one-year "preschool". The school year runs from early September to late June of the following year. Winter break runs from late December to early January, dividing the school year into two semesters. Peja is the only city in Kosovo that offers high school education in arts and there is also a school for the visually impaired.

Demography 

The Agjencia e Statistikave të Kosovës (ASK) estimated the population of the municipality of Peja at 96,450 in 2011.

According to the 1981 census, the city urban area had a population of 54,497 inhabitants; according to the 1991 census it had grown to 68,163. According to the 2011 census, around 49,000 people live in the city of Peja.

The vast majority of the inhabitants are Kosovo Albanians. Most Kosovo Serbs live in the village enclaves of Goraždevac, Belo Polje and Ljevoša. There is also a large Bosniak community in the city of Peja and in Vitomirica, while significant Roma, Ashkali and Egyptian communities reside in urban and rural areas.

The ethnic composition of the city municipal area:

Culture

Architecture 

The architecture in Peja show different architectural styles, from the medieval Serbian, Ottoman, Yugoslav, and contemporary architecture. Because of this there are many churches, mosques, buildings which are attraction points in the city and were built by the aforementioned influences.

Notable architectural traits of Peja include:
Bazaar of Peja, Ottoman-era market in the center of the city. It was destroyed during World War II and the Kosovo War. It has been fully rebuilt.
Bajrakli Mosque, Ottoman-built mosque in the Bazaar of Peja. It was destroyed during World War II and then rebuilt.
Hamam of Peja, Ottoman-era bath

Cinema 

Peja has one local cinema, Kinema Jusuf Gërvalla, which also functions as a cultural center. It was built in 1955 with money of the Workers’ Union. Back then, the cinema was called 'Kino Rad' ('Workers' Cinema'). Its goals was to provide a cultural space in the city of Peja. During the period 1955-1998 it served as a central point of joint cultural activities for the residents of Peja. Activities included screenings of the latest films, public discussions, music concerts, theatrical performances and children's programs. The cinema was closed down when the war started in 1998 and was heavily damaged in the years after, just like the rest of Peja. In 2000, the building was renovated and partly reconstructed. In 2001, the cinema was reopened, with its name changed to ‘Kinema Jusuf Gërvalla’ in 2002. However, activities became more sporadic, due to technical difficulties and lack of public interest.

In 2016, by a municipal decision, the cinema with all its assets was given to the non-governmental organization Anibar, which since 2010 organized the Anibar International Animation Festival in the cinema. The goal was to revitalize Kinema Jusuf Gërvalla. But later that year the Privatization Agency of Kosovo put the building on the list of buildings for privatization, which meant it would lose its public function. However, backlash emerged against the idea of taking this important historic and cultural site from the local community. The protests secured Kinema Jusuf Gërvalla a spot on the temporary list of protected cultural heritage buildings in Kosovo. Currently, Kinema Jusuf Gërvalla is functioning as a cultural center which hosts movie screenings, musical performances, poetry nights, board game nights, and more. It also offers guided tours, which introduces you to the rich history of the cinema.

Festivals 

Anibar International Animation Festival

Sport 

Peja is one of the more successful cities in Kosovan sport. The city is home to the first Olympic Medal for Kosovo, won by Judoka Majlinda Kelmendi in Rio de Janeiro Games in 2016. Her team also has won numerous other medals including gold and bronze in the World and European championships. The main football team of the city is KF Besa Pejë, its basketball teams is KB Peja. KB Peja is the older and more established basketball team. Additionally the city is host to a handball team, KH Besa Famiglia, a volleyball team KV Besa, a judo team Ippon, an athletic team Besa, as well as a women's basketball team KB Penza. Since June 2008 Peja has also a Taekwondo Team: Tae Kwon Do Club Peja (Klubi i Tae Kwon Do-së Peja).

Peja has its aeroclub called "Aeroklub Peja", which was founded in 1948. Last years this club is part of competitions in several countries. In June 2013 it was the organizer of "second Paragliding event" which included paragliders from Kosovo and Albania In 2014 it was the organizer of an international contest called "Peja open PARAGLIDING CUP 2014".

See also 
List of people from Peja

Notes

References

External links 

Municipality of PejaOfficial Website

 
Peja
Peja
Populated places in Peja District
Accursed Mountains
Gegëri